Héctor Damián Schmidt (born 7 December 1992) is an Argentine professional footballer who plays for C.S.D. Macará.

References

External links
 

Living people
1992 births
Argentine people of German descent
Argentine footballers
Argentine expatriate footballers
Argentine Primera División players
Primera Nacional players
Liga MX players
Ecuadorian Serie A players
Instituto footballers
Racing Club de Avellaneda footballers
Club Puebla players
San Martín de San Juan footballers
San Martín de Tucumán footballers
Club Atlético Colón footballers
C.S.D. Macará footballers
Association football defenders
Argentine expatriate sportspeople in Mexico
Argentine expatriate sportspeople in Ecuador
Expatriate footballers in Mexico
Expatriate footballers in Ecuador